James Cobley (1877-1958), was an Australian lawn bowls international who competed in the 1950 British Empire Games.

Bowls career
At the 1950 British Empire Games he won the silver medal in the fours event with his brother John Cobley, Len Knight and Charles Cordaiy.

He was the 1949 Australian National Bowls Championships rinks (fours) winner, bowling with the same trio and for the Parkes Bowls Club in New South Wales.

References

Australian male bowls players
1877 births
1958 deaths
Bowls players at the 1950 British Empire Games
Commonwealth Games silver medallists for Australia
Commonwealth Games medallists in lawn bowls
People from Shepparton
20th-century Australian people
Medallists at the 1950 British Empire Games